Nepesta is an unincorporated community in Pueblo County, in the U.S. state of Colorado.

History
A post office called Nepesta was established in 1876, and remained in operation until 1929. "Rio Nepesta" is a variant name of the nearby Arkansas River.

References

Unincorporated communities in Pueblo County, Colorado
Unincorporated communities in Colorado